You're Gonna Miss Me is an American documentary film by Keven McAlester. It focuses on Roky Erickson, the former frontman for the rock band The 13th Floor Elevators. The band is cited as pioneers of the psychedelic rock genre. The film covers Erickson's rise to fame, his excessive use of LSD, struggles with schizophrenia, and his 1969 marijuana arrest that led to stays at Austin State Hospital and Rusk State Hospital for the Criminally Insane. Erickson was irrevocably changed after the onset of his illness and he went long stretches with little interest in making or performing music. The film opens with Erickson, who had been living as a total recluse for over a decade. What follows is a closer look at how "the great lost vocalist of rock and roll" came to live in poverty and isolation, struggles to receive effective treatments, and how he manages to return to music and life. The film takes its name from the debut single by The 13th Floor Elevators.

The documentary was nominated for a 2007 Independent Spirit Award for Best Documentary.

External links 

 Official Facebook page
Soundtrack review
 
You're Gonna Miss Me New York Times review
You're Gonna Miss Me Chicago Sun-Times review
You're Gonna Miss Me on NPR's "All Things Considered"

2005 films
Psychedelic rock
Documentary films about singers
Documentary films about schizophrenia
Films set in Austin, Texas
2000s English-language films